Boxing at the 2019 African Games was held from 20 to 29 August 2019 at the Al Amal Indoor Sports Center in Rabat, Morocco.

Participating nations

Results

Men's events

Women's events

Medal table

References

External links
Results book
Results

2019 African Games
African Games
2019 African Games
2019